First Monday is a 2002 American TV series.

First Monday may also refer to:

 First Monday (journal), an online scientific journal for articles about the Internet 
 First Monday Trade Days, a flea market in Canton, Texas

See also 
 First Monday in October, a 1978 play by Jerome Lawrence and Robert E. Lee
 First Monday in October (film), a 1981 American film based on the play
The First Monday in May, 2016 documentary film by Andrew Rossi